Big Frog Mountain is a mountain located primarily in southeastern Tennessee in the Big Frog Wilderness, within the Cherokee National Forest. It is located within the Blue Ridge Mountains, part of the Appalachian Mountains.

Geography
Most of Big Frog Mountain, including its summit, is located in Polk County, Tennessee, which is also the highest point in that county. Part of the mountain south of the summit is located in Fannin County, Georgia. It is located on the divide between the Tennessee and Coosa basins. A network of trails allow hikers to explore the mountain, which gains its distinctive name by, according to some, looking somewhat like a frog in profile. It has also been speculated that the local place name "Cohutta" derived from a Cherokee word meaning "Big Frog"

Large patches of rhododendron can be found on the western part of the mountaintop.

References

External links
 

Mountains of Tennessee
Protected areas of Polk County, Tennessee
Cherokee National Forest
Landforms of Polk County, Tennessee